Tendelti is a small town in White Nile State, Central Sudan. Tendelti is an administrative Locality in the White Nile State and it is on the borders Between White Nile State and Northern Kordofan State.

Tendelti is of a population of an almost 750,000 people, which are mostly from Arab tribes.

Transport
It is served by a station that lies in the main road between Khartoum and Western Sudan, where the road passes Tendelti from Kosti to Um Rawaba in Northern Kordofan. Also, Tendelti is a conjunction of roads that connecting the northern part of the locality and the transportation from El Dewaim and Khartoum at the Western Bank of White Nile.

Manufacturing
The first ice cream Factory (Loli) was open in Tendelti in 1983.

See also
 Railway stations in Sudan

References

Populated places in White Nile (state)